Weston station is a former railroad station in Weston, Massachusetts. Located off Church Street in the Weston town center, it was originally operated by the Central Massachusetts Railroad, which constructed it in the board-and-batten style in 1881.

The station building was reused by a news agency by 1962, by which time it and Kendal Green station had the same private owner. Boston and Maine Railroad service was subsidized by the MBTA and added to the MBTA Commuter Rail system in 1965. The station closed on November 26, 1971, when service on the Central Mass Branch was terminated due to poor track conditions and low ridership. The station was located below grade, with a staircase leading from the Church Street overpass to the station. The station building and staircase are still extant , but are in disrepair.

References

External links

MACRIS Listing - Massachusetts Central Railroad Station

MBTA Commuter Rail stations in Middlesex County, Massachusetts
Former MBTA stations in Massachusetts
Weston, Massachusetts
Railway stations in the United States opened in 1881
Railway stations closed in 1971
1971 disestablishments in Massachusetts
1881 establishments in Massachusetts